The 1975 Belgian motorcycle Grand Prix was the eighth round of the 1975 Grand Prix motorcycle racing season. It took place on the weekend of 4–6 July 1975 at the Circuit de Spa-Francorchamps.

500cc classification

References

Belgian motorcycle Grand Prix
Belgian
Motorcycle Grand Prix